Valentina Mikhailovna Kuznetsova (21 January 1937 - 3 September 2010) was a Soviet - Russian radio technician and polar researcher.

Biography 
Kuznetsova was born in Moscow and worked as an architect-technician in the Gipropischtscheprom. She studied radio at Moscow Aviation Institute. She was a member of the national ski team, and trained with Alevtina Kolchina.

In 1966, Kuznetsova founded the ski group  (Snowstorm). She led a polar expedition.

References 

2010 deaths
Russian women engineers
Soviet female cross-country skiers
1937 births
Russian and Soviet polar explorers
Female polar explorers
Moscow Aviation Institute alumni
Russian female cross-country skiers
Russian electrical engineers
Engineers from Moscow